Bolts of Melody is the first studio album by Adam Franklin .

Track listing
All tracks by Adam Franklin except Theme From LSD by Adam Franklin/Steve George/Jeff Townsin

 "Seize the Day" –2:12
 "Sundown" – 3:50
 "Morning Rain" – 3:59
 "Song of Solomon" – 3:13
 "Theme from LSD" – 5:06
 "Shining Somewhere" – 3:44
 "Birdsong (Moonshiner Version)" – 2:58
 "Canvey Island Baby" – 4:35
 "Syd's Eyes" – 2:29
 "Walking In Heaven's Foothills" – 4:04
 "Birdsong" – 4:19
 "Rain Return" – 1:11
 "Ramonesland" – 6:46
 "Silver Freight Train" – 4:27 (Australian bonus track)

Personnel
Adam Franklin – guitars, vocals, some bass, keyboards, drums on Syd's Eyes, production, mixing
Locksley Taylor – bass, keyboards, some guitars, all instruments on Rain Return, recording engineer
Matt Durrant – drums on 2,3,5,6,8,11,13
Ron Lowder – drums on Seize the Day
Mike Taylor– piano on Sundown and Ramonesland
Charlie Francis –  mixing, production
Dean Williams – recording engineer
Lurch - drums recording engineer
Jason Marcucci – recording engineer on Seize the Day
Suneil Pusari – recording engineer on Song of Solomon
TJ Doherty – mixing on Syd's Eyes
Arjun Agerwala – recording engineer for drums on Syd's Eyes
John Golden – mastering
Alison Pie – sleeve photograph and design

Adam Franklin albums
2007 debut albums